Denis Delestrac is a French director and producer who is best known for creating feature-length investigative documentaries. His films focus on the ecological, social, and political impacts of natural resources. His film Sand Wars influenced the United Nations Environmental Program to write a report on sand scarcity in 2019.

He has won over 30 international prizes and became a member of the European Film Academy in 2017.

Career
Denis Delestrac graduated from the Toulouse Law School and obtained a Master in Journalism at the University of Dallas. He began working as a photojournalist, and later as a writer, in the United States covering the South Central LA riots, the Waco siege and the 1992 presidential elections.

Denis Delestrac made his debut in non-fiction filmmaking in 2001. In addition to his TV and theatrical non-fiction works, Delestrac directs branded content films for brands or events through his production company Intrepido Films.

Private life 
Delestrac resides with his wife and his daughter in Barcelona and Paris.

Selected filmography

Selected awards

 Best film – Inspiration Category –  EKO Film 2013 
 Gold Panda for Best Nature & Environment Protection Award – Sishuan TV Festival 2013
 Golden Sun – Barcelona Environmental Film Festival 2013
 Japan Prize NHK 2013 – 2nd Prize
 Greenpeace Prize – Festival du Film Vert 2014
 Best film – San Francisco International Ocean Film Festival 2014
 Finalist – Monte Carlo 33rd International URTI Grand Prix for Author's Documentary
 Rockie Award – Banff World Media Festival 2014
 Prix Gémeaux 2014
 Winner – Wild and Scenic Film Festival 2015
 Best Film – Green Me Film Festival 2015
 Winner: "Impact Prize" – FIGRA 2015
 Best Environmental Film – Cayman International Film Festival 2015
 Winner of the Expo Milano Prize 2015 
 Best Full Length Documentary – 8th Kuala Lumpur Eco Film Fest 2015 
 Award of the Faculty of Forestry and Wood Sciences – Life Sciences Film Festival Prague 
 Grand Prize of the City of Innsbruck 2015 
 Best International Feature Award – Planet in Focus – Toronto 2015 
 Golden Sun – FICMA 2015 
 Special Prize – "Emys Foundation" 2015 
 Greenpeace Prize – Festival du Film vert de Genève 2016
 Best Film – Another Way Film Festival 2016
 Grands Prix – Ecrans Publics 2016
 Winner – Deauville Green Awards 2016
 Finalist – DIG Awards 2016
 Winner – Deauville Green Awards 2018
 Winner – 3rd place On Art Film Festival 2018

Professional affiliations
 Member of the European Film Academy
 Member of the International Federation of Journalists
 Founding member of The Barcelona International Documentary Club
 Membre Sociétaire Stagiaire du collège audiovisuel de la Société Civile des Auteurs Multimédia

References

External links
 Official Website
 
"Captain's Dream" Official Movie Site
 "Freightened" Official Movie Site
 "Sand Wars" Official Movie Site
 "Pax Americana and the Weaponization of Space" Official Movie Site
 "Breaking the Set" interview by Abby Martin
 TEDx Talk

Living people
French film directors
1968 births